Papadates ( or Παππαδάτες) is a village in the regional unit of Aetolia-Acarnania. Situated in the region of West Greece, since 2011, it is part of the municipality of Agrinio.

Papadates is located 12 km from the city of Agrinio, on the foothills of Arakynthos mountain and is one of the villages surrounding Lake Trichonida, the biggest Greek natural lake. It borders with the villages of Zevgaraki to the west and Mataranga to the east. It was the capital of the former municipality of Arakynthos.

The village has a population of 1,098 people (2011) and a land area of 12.235 km².

See also
List of settlements in Aetolia-Acarnania

References

Populated places in Aetolia-Acarnania